The 80s was a decade that ran from January 1, AD 80, to December 31, AD 89.

As the decade began, the Parthian Empire was in a phase of division until Pacorus II managed to consolidate his rule, eliminating the two rival contenders for his throne: Vologases II in AD 80 and Artabanus III in AD 81. Domitian became Roman emperor in AD 81: The military campaigns undertaken during his reign were generally defensive in nature, as the Emperor rejected the idea of expansionist warfare. His most significant military contribution was the development of the Limes Germanicus, which encompassed a vast network of roads, forts and watchtowers constructed along the Rhine river to defend the Empire. Nevertheless, several important wars were fought in Gaul, against the Chatti, and across the Danube frontier against the Suebi, the Sarmatians, and the Dacians (see Domitian's Dacian War). In northern Britain, the Romans defeated local tribes in the Battle of Mons Graupius (AD 83). In China, the Han–Xiongnu War continued, with the Battle of the Altai Mountains (AD 89) bringing the Northern Xiongnu to the brink of collapse. The death of Emperor Zhang of Han ended a golden age.

In spring of AD 80, a fire broke out in Rome and burned large parts of the city for three days and three nights. Although the extent of the damage was not as disastrous as during the Great Fire of 64 and crucially spared the many districts of insulae, Cassius Dio records a long list of important public buildings that were destroyed, including Agrippa's Pantheon, the Temple of Jupiter, the Diribitorium, parts of the Theatre of Pompey, and the Saepta Julia among others. Emperor Titus personally compensated for the damaged regions. According to Suetonius, a plague also broke out during the fire. The nature of the disease, however, and the death toll are unknown.

Having been under construction since AD 70–72, the Colosseum was finally completed in AD 80, and its inaugural games were held that same year. Also in AD 80, the Eifel Aqueduct and Stadium of Domitian were constructed. Literary works that were composed around this time include Punica (a Latin epic poem themed around the Second Punic War), Thebaid (which recounts the clash of two brothers, Eteocles and Polynices, over the throne of the Greek city of Thebes) and the Gospel of Matthew (the first book of the New Testament of the Bible).

Manning (2008) tentatively estimates the world population in AD 80 to have been 250 million.

Significant people
 Titus Flavius Vespasianus, Roman Emperor (AD 79–81)
 Titus Flavius Domitianus, Roman Emperor (AD 81–96)

References